Selected Manifestations: Being an Unofficial Collection of Temple Dedicatory Prayers, Revelations, Visions, Dreams, Doctrinal Expositions, & Other Inspired Declarations Not Presently Included in the Official Canon of Scriptures Known as the Four Standard Works of the Church of Jesus Christ of Latter-day Saints is a 413-page book self-published in 1985 by David M. and Vonda S. Reay.  It is a compilation of scarce, non-canonical revelations of leaders of the Church of Jesus Christ of Latter-day Saints (LDS Church).

Contents
The book contains 185 revelations, visions, temple dedications, etc..., some of which are very short or intended for a specific individual rather than general readers.  The library of the church-owned Brigham Young University (BYU) identifies the book as containing "Private revelations".

Each revelation is presented in its own enumerated "selection" which is further divided into numbered verses.  Although these revelations are excluded from the accepted canon of the LDS Church, they are presented in a very similar format to the church's canonical Doctrine and Covenants (D&C), which also contains revelations of LDS Church leaders divided into "sections" and verses.  The book billed itself as belonging "alongside the four Standard Works" because it contained nearly all the revelations and declarations of the church's Apostles and Prophets that weren't already included in the D&C.

The various revelations in the book include:
 Vision of the Savior at the School of the Prophets
 A Revelation on Copyrights for Church Publications
 A Revelation Reproving the Brethren for Not Honoring Official Titles
 Remarks to the Twelve on the Endowment
 Revelation on Eternal Progress of Mankind Given to Lorenzo Snow
 Revelation on the Council of Fifty Giving Full Name
 Revelation on the Proper Names of God by Elder Orson Pratt
 Revelation on the Design of Temples by President Brigham Young
 Vision of the Savior in Gethsemane Given to Orson F. Whitney
 Revelation on the Holy Priesthood
 Visitations of Joseph the Prophet to President Wilford Woodruff
 Vision of Savior in Salt Lake Temple Given to Melvin J. Ballard
 Status of Children in the Resurrection by Joseph F. Smith
 Power of the Holy Priesthood by President Joseph Fielding Smith
 Vision of the Lamanites Given to President Spencer W. Kimball
Also included are revelations to David O. McKay and others, and famous speeches from such figures as Boyd K. Packer and Bruce R. McConkie.  In addition, the book contained dedication prayers for all the church's Temples at that time, as well as for uncompleted sites, such as Independence, Far West, and Adam-Ondi-Ahman.  Among the twelve appendices is a bibliography on the D&C and a list of the Priesthood Courses of Study.

Scarcity
Shortly after publication in 1985, Selected Manifestations was recalled from retailer bookshelves, reportedly over copyright concerns with the LDS Church, and due to the fact that they were arranged like scriptures, i.e. the Doctrine and Covenants, but in "Selections" rather than "Sections." Another controversial feature was that the book was dedicated to our "Mother in Heaven."  Some allege the church tried to stop its publication and ordered the authors, who were members of the church in Oakland, California, to stop selling it.  Copies of the book are rare (it is believed that only about 200 copies exist) and it is listed in Bret Eborn's "Guide to Mormon Books" and sells for $400 to $800 on the rare book market.  The book is usually on rare book dealer want lists.

References

1985 books
American non-fiction books
Recalled publications
LDS non-fiction
1985 in Christianity